Sherwin Dandery Seedorf (born 17 March 1998) is a Dutch professional footballer who plays as a winger.

Early and personal life
Seedorf was born in Rotterdam. He is distantly related to Clarence Seedorf.

Career
After beginning his career with Excelsior and NAC Breda, Seedorf spent seven years with Feyenoord, and later played for Nike Academy before signing for Wolverhampton Wanderers in January 2017. He signed on loan for Bradford City in June 2018. He moved on loan to Spanish club FC Jumilla in January 2019.

In July 2019 he moved to Scottish club Motherwell, signing a two-year contract. On his debut for Motherwell, he scored his first career goal, in a 3–0 win away to Queen of the South in the Scottish League Cup group stages. His first  league goal came on 31 August 2019, in a 3–0 win at home against Hibernian, and he scored again in the following match, away to Heart of Midlothian. He was released by the club at the end of the 2020–21 season. Seedorf was taken on trial by Czech top flight club Banik Ostrava during the summer of 2021 but was unsuccessful and was not offered a contract.

Career statistics

References

1998 births
Living people
Footballers from Rotterdam
Dutch footballers
Dutch sportspeople of Surinamese descent
Excelsior Rotterdam players
NAC Breda players
Feyenoord players
Nike Academy players
Wolverhampton Wanderers F.C. players
Bradford City A.F.C. players
FC Jumilla players
Motherwell F.C. players
English Football League players
Scottish Professional Football League players
Association football wingers
Dutch expatriate footballers
Expatriate footballers in England
Expatriate footballers in Spain
Expatriate footballers in Scotland
Dutch expatriate sportspeople in England
Dutch expatriate sportspeople in Spain
Dutch expatriate sportspeople in Scotland
Seedorf family